The Church of Saint Mary in Limington, Somerset, England dates from the late 14th century and includes fragments of an earlier building. It has been designated as a Grade I listed building.

Fragments of the north door and tower date from the Norman period, but most of the building are from the 14th century with the north chapel being dated to 1328. It is built of local stone with Hamstone dressings. The tower has six bells, the oldest of which is from the 15th century. The interior includes a pulpit and altar table from the 17th century and an octagonal font from the 16th. There are several effigies including one of Sir Richard Gyvernay who built the chantry chapel and died in 1329. Below this is a smaller female figure  and there is also a double monument of a male and female figure, which are believed to be Henry and Matilda Power and date from the 1340s.

The earliest known rector is Thomas Wolsey who held the living between 1500 and 1509, before becoming a cardinal of the Roman Catholic Church.

The Anglican parish is part of the benefice of  Ilchester with Northover, Limington Yeovilton and Podimore within the archdeaconry of Wells.

See also

 List of Grade I listed buildings in South Somerset
 List of towers in Somerset
 List of ecclesiastical parishes in the Diocese of Bath and Wells

References

14th-century church buildings in England
Church of England church buildings in South Somerset
Grade I listed churches in Somerset
Grade I listed buildings in South Somerset